Bois Blanc Lighthouse may refer to

Bois Blanc Island Lighthouse and Blockhouse, a National Historic Site of Canada, on Bois Blanc Island, Ontario
Bois Blanc Light, on Bois Blanc Island, Michigan, United States